Surgeon Vice Admiral Sir Godfrey James Milton-Thompson, KBE (25 April 1930 – 23 September 2012) was a senior Royal Navy officer. From 1988 to 1990, he was Surgeon-General, senior medical officer of the British Armed Forces.

Early life
Milton-Thompson was the younger son of the Revd James Milton-Thompson, a Church of England priest on the Wirral, Cheshire. He was educated at Eastbourne College before going to read Medicine at Queens' College, Cambridge (MA) and further medical study at St Thomas' Hospital (MB, BChir). He was elected a Fellow of the Royal College of Physicians in 1974.

Military service
Milton-Thompson joined the Royal Navy in 1955, in which he saw 35 years active service. He was Surgeon General in the Ministry of Defence from 1988 to 1990. He was a Queen's Honorary Physician (QHP) from 1982 until 1990. From 1990 until 1995 he became Honorary Colonel of 211th (Wessex) Field Hospital Royal Army Medical Corps.

Later life
Milton-Thompson served as Hospitaller of the Most Venerable Order of St John of Jerusalem and Chairman of the St John Fellowship.

Personal life
Milton-Thompson married Noreen Fitzmaurice, the daughter of Sir Desmond Fitzmaurice CIE, in 1952. They had three daughters.

References

External links
 Entry on the Burke's Peerage website
 www.telegraph.co.uk

1930 births
2012 deaths
Medical doctors from Cheshire
Military personnel from Cheshire
People educated at Eastbourne College
Royal Navy vice admirals
Surgeons-General of the British Armed Forces
Alumni of Queens' College, Cambridge
Fellows of the Royal College of Surgeons
Knights Commander of the Order of the British Empire
Knights of Justice of the Order of St John
Royal Navy Medical Service officers